Rocafuerte is a town in the Rocafuerte Canton within the Manabí province of Ecuador.

Sources 
World-Gazetteer.com

Populated places in Manabí Province